Verkh-Yemash is a rural locality (a village) in Chernushinsky District, Perm Krai, Russia. The population was 150 as of 2010. There are 3 streets.

Geography 
Verkh-Yemash is located 16 km south of Chernushka (the district's administrative centre) by road. Taush is the nearest rural locality.

References 

Rural localities in Chernushinsky District